The Seafarer 31 Mark II is an American sailboat that was designed by McCurdy & Rhodes as a racer-cruiser and first built in 1974.

The design was marketed by the manufacturer as the Seafarer 31 Mark II, to differentiate it from the unrelated William H. Tripp Jr. 1968 Seafarer 31 Mark I design.

Production
The design was built by Seafarer Yachts in the United States, starting in 1974, but it is now out of production.

Design
The Seafarer 31 Mark II is a recreational keelboat, built predominantly of fiberglass, with a balsa-cored deck and with wood trim. It has a masthead sloop rig; a raked stem; a raised counter, reverse transom; a skeg-mounted rudder controlled by a wheel and a fixed fin keel. It displaces  and carries  of lead ballast.

The boat is fitted with a Universal Atomic 4  gasoline engine or optionally a Palmer M-60 gasoline engine for docking and maneuvering.

The design has sleeping accommodation for five people, with a double "V"-berth in the bow cabin, an "L"-shaped or optional "U"-shaped settee around a drop-down table and a straight settee in the main cabin. The galley is located on the port side just forward of the companionway ladder. The galley is "U"-shaped and is equipped with a three-burner stove, an ice box and a sink. A navigation station is opposite the galley, on the starboard side. The head is located just aft of the bow cabin on the both sides. 

See also
List of sailing boat types

References

Keelboats
1970s sailboat type designs
Sailing yachts
Sailboat type designs by McCurdy & Rhodes
Sailboat types built by Seafarer Yachts